Associazione Sportiva Dilettantistica Atletico Castenaso Van Goof
is an Italian association football club, based in Castenaso, Emilia-Romagna. It currently plays in Serie D.

History

Atletico Castenaso Van Goof
The club was founded in 2012 after the merger between A.S.D. Castenaso Villanova and A.S.C. Atletico Van Goof.

Before the merger

Castenaso Villanova 
A.S.D. Castenaso Villanova  in the season 2011–12 was promoted for the first time, from Eccellenza Emilia-Romagna/B to Serie D.

A.S.C. Atletico Van Goof 
A.S.C. Atletico Van Goof was founded in 1997 in Terza Categoria Bologna and in the season 2004–05 was promoted to Eccellenza Emilia-Romagna, but was immediately relegated to Promozione Emilia-Romagna. In the season 2011–12 it was even relegated to Promozione Emilia-Romagna.

Colors and badge 
Its colors are red and blue.

References

External links
Official homepage

Football clubs in Italy
Football clubs in Emilia-Romagna